Daulatsinhji Pratapsinhji Jadeja was an Indian politician and the member of parliament who represented Jamnagar Lok Sabha constituency from 1971 to 1984 in the Fifth, Seventh and Eighth Lok Sabha. He also served assembly member of Gujarat state from 1977 to 1980.

Life and background 
Jadeja was born on 3 April 1935 in Jamnagar town of Gujarat.He belongs to Jamnagar Royal family. He was studying at Rajkumar College, Rajkot and D. G. Rural College, Aliabada Gujarat where he did Bachelor of Arts.

Career
Jadeja was born in a village of Gujarat  from where he started his political career serving as member of the legislative assembly to Government of Gujarat and member of parliament to Government of India. He was initially served in several government departments with different designations and then established his associations with Indian National Congress. He was first elected as the district president of Congress party and then became parliament member during the fifth general elections of India and remained in the office from 1971 to 1977. He then contested assembly elections and served as the assembly member of Gujarat state from 1977 to 1980. It was 1980 when he was re-elected in seventh lok sabha and served from 1980 to 1984, and 1984 to 1989 when he was re-elected in eighth general elections of India.

References 

1935 births
India MPs 1971–1977
India MPs 1980–1984
India MPs 1984–1989
People from Gujarat
Gujarat MLAs 1975–1980
Living people
Indian politicians